Teatro Regio (Italian for 'Royal Theatre') may refer to several opera houses in Italy:
Teatro Regio (Parma)
Teatro Regio (Turin)
Teatro Regio Ducale, Milan, a predecessor of La Scala

See also
Theatre Royal (disambiguation)
Royal Theatre (disambiguation)